Amal is a language spoken along the border of Sandaun Province and East Sepik Province, Papua New Guinea, along the Wagana River near the confluence with Wanibe Creek. Foley (2018) classifies Amal as a primary branch of the Sepik languages, though it is quite close to Kalou.

Pronouns
Pronouns are:

{| 
|+ Amal pronouns
!  !! sg !! pl
|-
! 1
| ŋan || nut
|-
! 2
| in || kun
|-
! 3
| may || ilum
|}

Cognates
Amal cognates with Sepik languages are:

tal ‘woman’
yan ‘child’
lal ‘tongue’ < proto-Sepik *ta(w)r
mi ‘breast’ < proto-Sepik *muk
waplo ‘liver’
nip ‘blood’
yen ‘egg’
ak ‘house’

Foley (2018) notes that there appears to be somewhat more lexical similarities between Amal and the Tama languages, but does not consider them to form a group with each other.

Vocabulary
The following basic vocabulary words of Amal are from Laycock (1968), as cited in the Trans-New Guinea database:

{| class="wikitable sortable"
! gloss !! Amal
|-
! head
| makələ
|-
! ear
| marj
|-
! eye
| nai
|-
! nose
| yimeʔ
|-
! tooth
| pu
|-
! tongue
| lal
|-
! leg
| lü
|-
! louse
| ŋin
|-
! dog
| wun
|-
! bird
| yok
|-
! egg
| yen
|-
! blood
| niːp
|-
! bone
| nəŋolak
|-
! skin
| puːk
|-
! breast
| m
|-
! tree
| piːt
|-
! man
| wul
|-
! woman
| tal
|-
! sun
| mwak
|-
! moon
| yimal
|-
! water
| iːp
|-
! fire
| waː
|-
! stone
| tipal
|-
! two
| kila
|}

References

Yellow–Wanibe languages
Languages of Sandaun Province
Languages of East Sepik Province